Clare may refer to:

Places

Antarctica
 Clare Range, a mountain range in Victoria Land

Australia
 Clare, South Australia, a town in the Clare Valley
 Clare Valley, South Australia

Canada
 Clare (electoral district), an electoral district
 Clare, Nova Scotia, a municipal district

Republic of Ireland
 County Clare, one of the 32 counties of Ireland
 Clare, County Westmeath, a townland in Killare civil parish, barony of Rathconrath
 Clare Island, County Mayo
 Clarecastle, a village in County Clare
 Clare (Dáil constituency) (since 1921)
 Clare (UK Parliament constituency) (1801–1885)
 Clare (Parliament of Ireland constituency) (until 1800)
 River Clare, County Galway

South Africa
Clare, Mpumalanga, a town in Mpumalanga province

United Kingdom
 Clare, County Antrim, a townland in County Antrim, Northern Ireland
 Clare (Ballymore), a townland in County Armagh, Northern Ireland
 Clare, County Down, a townland in County Down, Northern Ireland
 Clare, County Tyrone, a townland in County Tyrone, Northern Ireland
 Clare, Oxfordshire, a location in England
 Clare, Suffolk, a small town
 Clare railway station, a closed station

United States
 Clare, Illinois, an unincorporated community
 Clare, Indiana, an unincorporated community
 Clare, Iowa, a city
 Clare, Kansas, an unincorporated community
 Clare, Michigan, a city
 Clare, New York, a town
 Clare County, Michigan

People and fictional characters 
 Clare (given name), includes a list of people and fictional characters
 Clare (surname), includes a list of people and fictional characters with the surname Clare or de Clare
 de Clare, a noble family in medieval England

Other uses 
 Clare Street
 Clare GAA, responsible for Gaelic games in County Clare
 Earl of Clare, an extinct title created three times, once each in the peerages of England, Great Britain, and Ireland
 Viscount Clare, an extinct title in the Peerage of Ireland, created twice
 Cyclone Clare, which struck Western Australia in 2006
 , a  destroyer traded to the Royal Navy and renamed HMS Clare at the beginning of the Second World War
 Clare College, Cambridge, a constituent college of the University of Cambridge
 The Clare, a residential skyscraper in Chicago, Illinois, United States
 Contact lens acute red eye, an inflammatory condition of the cornea due to overwearing of contact lenses
 "Clare", a song by Fairground Attraction

See also
 Saint Clare (disambiguation)
 Clare Hall (disambiguation)
 Clare Valley (disambiguation)
 Clair (disambiguation)
 Clara (disambiguation)